Pil or PIL may refer to:

 Pil, Iran, a village in Mazandaran Province, Iran
 Pîl a placename element of Welsh origin.
 Carlos Miguel Jiménez Airport (IATA Code: PIL), in Pilar, Paraguay
 Port Isabel-Cameron County Airport (FAA Code: PIL), in Port Isabel, Texas
 Pacific International Lines, a Singapore-based shipping company
 Patient information leaflet
 Portland Interscholastic League, a high school athletic conference in Oregon
 Poslednja Igra Leptira, a former Yugoslavian pop rock band
 Protic ionic liquid
 Public Image Ltd, an English post-punk band
 Publishing Interchange Language
 Python Imaging Library

Legal terms
 Public international law
 Private international law
 Public interest law
 Public interest litigation in India